St. Francis is a city in Anoka and Isanti counties, Minnesota, United States. The population was 8,142 at the 2020 census.

Minnesota State Highway 47 serves as a main route in the city.  Other routes include Ambassador Boulevard.

History
St. Francis was named after Francis of Assisi.

In 1855 Dwight Woodbury built a dam, grist and saw mill, and the first house, which later became the Riverside Hotel. George Armsby and E. Fowler are considered to be the first settlers in the area.

St. Francis Township was settled in 1855 and organized in 1857. The name St. Francis comes from Louis Hennepin, who named the Rum River after St. Francis in 1680.

The first doctor to practice in St. Francis arrived in 1857 and was known as Dr. Marshall. In the same year, school was started at the home of M. Fowler, and Hattie Waterhouse became the first teacher.

In 1869, Burns Township (Nowthen) broke off from St. Francis Township.

In 1879, a general store was started by Pelutiar McClure. In 1888, a large mill was built and owned by Dwight Woodbury and called St. Francis Milling Co. A starch and canning factory was built in 1893. In the early 1890s, Blanchette's Sample Room Beer Parlour was opened, and was turned into an ice cream parlor when the school was consolidated. The ice cream parlor was run until the owner died in 1933. On July 18, 1933 the mill burnt down and the dam was destroyed.  By this time, there was also a blacksmith shop, drug store, and a meat market which was later turned into a livery stable.

Pioneer Days started in 1964.

St. Francis was incorporated on May 16, 1962 and became a statutory city in 1974 when villages were removed as a subdivision in Minnesota.

Geography
St. Francis is located in the northwest part of Anoka County.

Nearby places include Bethel, East Bethel, Oak Grove, Nowthen, Elk River, Zimmerman, Crown, and Isanti.

Lake George is nearby. St. Francis lies just north of the Minneapolis–Saint Paul metropolitan area.

Demographics

As of 2000 the median income for a household in the city was $51,982, and the median income for a family was $52,193. Males had a median income of $40,585 versus $28,112 for females. The per capita income for the city was $19,957.  About 3.0% of families and 4.8% of the population were below the poverty line, including 4.4% of those under age 18 and 5.0% of those age 65 or over.

2010 census
As of the census of 2010, there were 7,218 people, 2,520 households, and 1,913 families residing in the city. The racial makeup of the city was 95.9% White, 0.6% African American, 0.4% Native American, 0.8% Asian, 0.2% from other races, and 2.0% from two or more races. Hispanic or Latino of any race were 1.4% of the population.

There were 2,520 households, of which 46.7% had children under the age of 18 living with them, 55.6% were married couples living together, 13.8% had a female householder with no husband present, 6.5% had a male householder with no wife present, and 24.1% were non-families. 17.8% of all households were made up of individuals, and 4% had someone living alone who was 65 years of age or older. The average household size was 2.86 and the average family size was 3.22.

The median age in the city was 31.5 years. 31.7% of residents were under the age of 18; 8.1% were between the ages of 18 and 24; 32.8% were from 25 to 44; 20.8% were from 45 to 64; and 6.5% were 65 years of age or older. The gender makeup of the city was 49.5% male and 50.5% female.

Organizations
 St. Francis is the current home of the Land of Lakes Choirboys.

Notable people
 Sean Sherk, mixed martial artist
 Kiana Eide, rhythmic gymnast

See also 
 H. G. Leathers House
 Riverside Hotel (St. Francis, Minnesota)

References

External links
 St. Francis City Website
 St. Francis Public Schools

Cities in Anoka County, Minnesota
Cities in Minnesota